"Not Such an Innocent Girl" is the debut solo single by English singer Victoria Beckham. It was released on 17 September 2001 as the lead single from her self-titled debut solo album. It was the United Kingdom's 163rd best-seller of the year, peaking at number six on the UK Singles Chart. The song was originally recorded by American singer Willa Ford. However, her version was only performed live and never officially released.

Chart performance
In the United Kingdom, the single faced competition in a hugely-hyped supposed 'chart battle' with Kylie Minogue's single "Can't Get You Out of My Head". On the chart date of 29 September 2001, "Not Such an Innocent Girl" debuted at number six on the UK Singles Chart with first week sales of 35,000 units, while "Can't Get You Out of My Head" debuted at number one with first week sales of 306,000 units. It became the UK's 163rd best-seller of 2001. As of September 2021, "Not Such An Innocent Girl" has sold 93,000 copies in the UK.

Music video
The music video has a futuristic theme and features two Victorias: one dressed in all-white with blonde hair ("the good girl"), and the other in all-black with jet black hair ("the bad girl"). The video culminates into a "dance-off" and motorcycle race between the two Victorias. The complex video was shot almost entirely on a green set with a great deal of post-production, making it one of the most complex solo Spice Girl videos to date.

Track listings

 UK CD and cassette single
 "Not Such an Innocent Girl" – 3:16
 "In Your Dreams" – 3:50
 "Not Such an Innocent Girl"  – 5:15

 UK DVD single
 Behind the scenes footage of Victoria  – 0:30
 "Not Such an Innocent Girl"  – 3:37
 Behind the scenes footage of Victoria  – 0:30
 "Not Such an Innocent Girl"  – 6:56
 Behind the scenes footage of Victoria  – 0:30
 "Not Such an Innocent Girl"  – 5:15
 Behind the scenes footage of Victoria  – 0:30

 European CD single
 "Not Such an Innocent Girl" – 3:17
 "In Your Dreams" – 3:50

 Australasian CD single
 "Not Such an Innocent Girl" – 3:17
 "In Your Dreams" – 3:52
 "Not Such an Innocent Girl"  – 5:17
 "Not Such an Innocent Girl"  – 6:58
 "Not Such an Innocent Girl"  – 8:11

Charts

Release history

References

2001 debut singles
2001 songs
Music videos directed by Jake Nava
Songs written by Andrew Frampton (songwriter)
Songs written by Steve Kipner
Songs written by Victoria Beckham
Victoria Beckham songs
Virgin Records singles